Qarah Burun (also Romanized as Qarah Būrūn; also known as Qarah Borūn and Qareh Borūn) is a village in Bozkosh Rural District, in the Central District of Ahar County, East Azerbaijan Province, Iran. At the 2006 census, its population was 40, in 8 families.

References 

Populated places in Ahar County